Keep Your Distance is the debut album by the British band Curiosity Killed the Cat, released in April 1987. It debuted at #1 on the UK Albums Chart, and is their only album to chart on the Billboard 200, reaching #55.

Track listing

Charts

Weekly charts

Year-end charts

Certifications

References 

1987 debut albums
Albums produced by Stewart Levine
Mercury Records albums
Curiosity Killed the Cat albums